The Hybrid is the debut studio album by American rapper Danny Brown, released March 16, 2010.

Background
The album, which was preceded by a number of free mixtapes, was also released as a free download, by Washington, DC record label Rappers I Know. The label later published the album on vinyl. A deluxe edition of the album was released for sale on Amazon on January 18, 2011, and later on iTunes on February 8, 2011, via Hybrid Music.

Reception
This music collective is what led Fool's Gold founder Nick Catchdubs, to sign Danny Brown to his indie record label. The album received critical acclaim, with critics highly praising Brown's unique rapping style and the album's production.

Track listing

References

External links

2010 debut albums
Danny Brown (rapper) albums
Albums produced by Nick Speed
Albums produced by Beat Butcha
Albums produced by Frank Dukes
Albums produced by Quelle Chris
Albums produced by Chuck Inglish
Albums free for download by copyright owner